The David Baronetcy, of Bombay, was a title in the Baronetage of the United Kingdom. It was created on 12 December 1911 for the Baghdadi Jewish businessman Sassoon David. He was succeeded by his son, Percival, the second Baronet, who became an important collector of Chinese porcelain. The title became extinct on the latter's death in 1964.

David baronets, of Bombay (1911)
Sir Sassoon Jacob Hai David, 1st Baronet (1849–1926)
Sir Percival Victor David, 2nd Baronet (1892–1964)

Arms

References

Extinct baronetcies in the Baronetage of the United Kingdom